Call of the Forest (German: Ruf der Wälder) is a 1965 Austrian drama film directed by Franz Antel and starring Hans-Jürgen Bäumler, Terence Hill and Gerhard Riedmann. It is part of the popular tradition of heimatfilm.

It was made at the Sievering Studios in Vienna and on location in the Alpine resort of Kaprun. The film's sets were designed by the art director Otto Pischinger.

Cast
 Hans-Jürgen Bäumler as Bernd Helwig  
 Terence Hill as Marcello Scalzi  
 Gerhard Riedmann as Mathias  
 Johanna Matz as Angelika Hirt  
 Paul Hörbiger as Gustl Wegrainer  
 Rudolf Prack as Ingenieur Prachner  
 Ellen Farner as Petra  
 Rolf Olsen as Kubesch  
 Judith Dornys as Tina  
 Franz Muxeneder as Pepi Nindl 
 Raoul Retzer as Zingerl  
 Eva Kinsky as Lucie  
 Erich Padalewski as Felix  
 Elisabeth Stiepl as Hofrätin

References

Bibliography 
 Hans-Michael Bock and Tim Bergfelder. The Concise Cinegraph: An Encyclopedia of German Cinema. Berghahn Books.

External links 
 

1965 films
1965 drama films
Austrian drama films
1960s German-language films
Films directed by Franz Antel
Films set in the Alps
Films set in forests
Films shot at Sievering Studios